The following is a list of automobile manufacturers of Italy.

Current major manufacturers

Other current manufacturers

 Alkè (1992–present)
 Auto EVO (2020-present)
 Automobili Estrema (2020–present)
 Automobili Mottola (2020-present)
 Automobili Pininfarina (2018–present)
 Automobili Turismo e Sport (1963; 2012–present)
 Ares Design (2018- present)
 B. Engineering (2001–present)
 Bizzarrini (1964–present)
 Casalini (1939–present)
 Cizeta (1988-present), manufacturer in U.S.A. but it was founded in Italy
 Corbellati (2018–present)
 Covini (1978–present)
 Dallara (1972–present)
 De Tomaso (1959–2004, 2015–present) 
 DR Automobiles (2006–present)
 Effeffe Cars (2016–present)
 Fioravanti (1987–present)
 FV-Frangivento (2019–present)
 Giotti Victoria (2007-present)
 Gruppo Bertone (1912–2014, 2014–present)
 Intermeccanica (1959-present), manufacturer in U.S.A. but it was founded in Italy
 Iso (1938–1974, 2017–present)
 Italcar (2005–present)
 Italdesign Giugiaro (1968–present)
 Manifattura Automobili Torino (2014–present)
 Mazzanti Automobili (2002–present)
 Osella (1965-present)
 Pambuffetti Automobili (2018-present)
 Picchio (1996–present)
 Puritalia Automobili (2010–present)
 Spada Vetture Sport (2008–present)
 Tazzari EV (2006–present)
 Town Life (2000-present)
 Wolf Racing Cars (2009–present)
 XEV (2016-present)
 Zagato (1919-present)

Former manufacturers

 ALCA (1947)
 ALFA (1910–1918, Now Alfa Romeo)
 APIS (1903)
 Ali Ciemme (1986–1992)
 Amilcar Italiana (1925–1928)
 Ansaldi (1904)
 Ansaldo (1921–1931)
 Anzani (1923–1924)
 Aquila (1906–1917)
 ASA (1962–1967)
 Aurea (1920–1933)
 Autobianchi (1957–1987)
 Bandini (1946–1992)
 Barosso (1923–1924)
 Beccaria (1911–1916)
 Bernardi (1899–1901)
 Biagini (1990–1993)
 Bianchi (1899–1939)
 Brixia-Zust (1906–1911)
 Bugatti Automobili S.p.A. (1987–1995)
 Bugatti & Gulinelli (1901–1903)
 Calafiore automobili (2017-2021)
 Cantono (1900–1911)
 Ceirano (1901–1904)
 Chiribiri (1910–1928)
 Cisitalia (1946–1965)
 Conrero (1951–1961)
 De Tomaso (1959–2004)
 De Vecchi (1905–1917)
 Diatto (1905–1955)
 Dora Electric
 Ermini (1948–1962)
 Esperia (1905–1910)
 FAST (1919–1925)
 Ferves (1965–1970)
 Fides (1905–1911)
 Fimer (1948–1949)
 Fissore (1971–1982)
 FLAG (1905–1908)
 Florentia (1903–1912)
 Fornasari (2001–2015)
 FOD (1925–1927; 1948–1949)
 Franco (1907–1912)
 Ghia (1915–1973)
 IATO (1989–1992)
 IENA (1921–1925)
 Innocenti (1961–1996)
 Isetta (1950–1970)
 Isotta Fraschini (1900–1948)
 Itala (1904–1935)
 Junior (1905–1910)
Lanza (1895–1903)
Lawil (1967–1986)
LMX Sirex (1968–1974)
Lombardi (1969–1974)
Maggiora (1905)
Majocchi (1898–1906)
Marca-Tre-Spade (1908–1911)
Marchand (1898–1909)
Martin (1990–2015)
Mazzieri (1993–1994)
Menon (1897–1902)
Monterosa (1959–1961)
Moretti (1945–1984)
Nardi (1947–1964)
Nazzaro (1911–1923)
Officine Meccaniche (OM) (1918–1939)
OSCA (1947–1967)
OSI (1963–1968)
Panther (circa 1956)
Prinetti & Stucchi (1898–1902)
Qvale (2000–2003)
Rapid (1905–1921)
Savio (1965–c.1983)
SCAT (1906–1923)
Scirea (1910–1927)
Serenissima (1965–1970)
SIAM (1921–1923)
Siata (1948–1970)
Siva (1967–1970)
SPA (1906–1926)
Standard/FAS (1906–1912)
Stanga (1948–c.1952)
Stanguellini (1946–1966)
Storero (1912–1919)
Taurinia (1902–1908)
Temperino (1919–1924)
Titania (1966)
Turinelli & Pezza (1899)
Urbanina (1965–c.1973)
Vaghi (1920–1924)
Vespa (1957–1961)
Zust (1905–1918)

See also
List of automobile manufacturers
List of automobile marques
List of motorcycle manufacturers
 List of motor scooter manufacturers and brands
List of truck manufacturers

References

Sources 
 G.N. Georgano, Nick (Ed.). The Beaulieu Encyclopedia of the Automobile. Chicago: Fitzroy Dearborn, 2000. 
 Mazur, Eligiusz (Ed.). World of Cars 2006/2007: Worldwide Car Catalogue.  Warsaw: Media Connection, 2006. 

Lists of automobile manufacturers
Cars
Automobile manufacturers